Sebastian Spreng (born April 6, 1956) is an Argentine-born American visual artist and music journalist. He is a self-taught artist. He lives in Bay Harbor Islands, Florida.

Biography 
Sebastian Spreng was born on April 6, 1956 in Esperanza, Santa Fe in Argentina. In 1987, he settled in Miami, Florida and has been a vital presence in the Florida art scene.

His awards include the Hortt Competition at the Museum of Art Fort Lauderdale and the 1995 Personal Achievement Award from the Muscular Dystrophy Association for the State of Florida, since earlier childhood, Spreng suffers from muscular dystrophy.

In 1994, he was commissioned by Metro-Dade Art In Public Places to create a permanent exhibition at the Miami-Dade Government Center.

In 2012, he was selected as one of the "100 Latinos of Miami", along other personalities, and as the 2013 Visual Artist of the 11th Edition of the Music@Menlo Chamber Music Festival in Atherton, California.

Since 2015 he works in IPad drawings presenting exhibitions totally dedicated to digital art in Miami, Santa Fe, and Panama. The series Das Lied von der Erde, based in Gustav Mahler song cycle comprised more than twenty Ipad drawings in several sizes.

In 2017 was named "Knight Champion of the Arts" by the John S. and James L. Knight Foundation and his works exhibited at the Knight Hall in the Adrienne Arsht Center for the Performing Arts.

At the Lowe Art Museum an exhibition about the destruction of Dresden consisting in iPad drawings printed on aluminum took place between March and September 2018.

References

External links
 Official Site

1956 births
American abstract artists
20th-century American painters
American male painters
21st-century American painters
21st-century American male artists
Argentine people of German descent
People from Bay Harbor Islands, Florida
People from Esperanza, Santa Fe
People from Santa Fe, Argentina
Argentine emigrants to the United States
American music critics
Living people
American bloggers
Artists from Miami
Opera critics
American music journalists
Classical music critics
20th-century Argentine painters
20th-century American male artists
Argentine male painters
21st-century American non-fiction writers
American male bloggers
20th-century Argentine male artists